Erzsébet Viski (born 22 February 1980 in Kismaros) is a Hungarian sprint canoer who competed from 1998 to 2005. Competing in two Summer Olympics, she won two silver medals in the K-4 500 m event (2000, 2004).

Viski also won fourteen medals at the ICF Canoe Sprint World Championships with eleven golds (K-4 200 m: 1998, 1999, 2001, 2002, 2003; K-4 500 m: 1999, 2001, 2002, 2003; K-4 1000 m: 2001, 2005) and three bronzes (K-1 500 m: 2005, K-2 200 m: 2001, K-4 1000 m: 2002).

References

External links
 
 

1980 births
Canoeists at the 2000 Summer Olympics
Canoeists at the 2004 Summer Olympics
Hungarian female canoeists
Living people
Olympic canoeists of Hungary
Olympic silver medalists for Hungary
Olympic medalists in canoeing
ICF Canoe Sprint World Championships medalists in kayak
Medalists at the 2004 Summer Olympics
Medalists at the 2000 Summer Olympics
Sportspeople from Pest County